Puyang is a prefecture-level city in northeastern Henan province, People's Republic of China. Located on the northern shore of the Yellow River, it borders Anyang in the west, Xinxiang in the southwest, and the provinces of Shandong and Hebei in the east and north respectively.

As of the 2020 census,its total population was 3,772,088 and its built-up (or metro) area made of Hualong district, Puyang County and Qingfeng County largely being conurbated, was home to 2,524,658 inhabitants.

Administration 
The prefecture-level city of Puyang administers 1 district and 5 counties.

Hualong District
Puyang County
Qingfeng County
Nanle County
Fan County
Taiqian County

Climate 
Affected by the south-east Asian monsoon circulation around the year and located in the mid-latitude region, the city has a warm temperate continental monsoon climate featuring clearly demarcated seasons. In spring, it is usually dry, windy and sandy. High temperatures and heavy rainfall mark the whole summer. In autumn there are plenty of sunny days as well as long periods of sunshine. In winter, it is characterized by less snow and rainfall. The adequate sunshine meets the needs for growing crops. The non-frost period lasts 205 days. The annual precipitation is around 502.3mm～601.3mm.

History 
The burial site of Yangshao culture features a depiction believed to be an ancient cosmogram depicting the round Heaven and the square Earth.

Puyang abounds with its historical and cultural heritage, and is widely acclaimed as one of the birthplaces of the Chinese nation. The Classic of Poetry, the earliest collection of verses in China, includes many poems that depict the countryside of Puyang. Famous historical figures from Puyang include Wu Qi, a military strategist, Shang Yang, a statesman, and Lü Buwei, a great thinker.

Three Kingdoms
During the Three Kingdoms era, Puyang served as Cao Cao's headquarters from 191 until 196 CE in Yan Province and served as the battlefield for the Battle of Yan Province from 194-195 CE.

Qing Dynasty and Republic of China 
Puyang was a county of Daming Prefecture, Zhili province. In 1928, Zhili was abolished and Puyang was incorporated into Henan province.

People's Republic of China 
In August 1949 Puyang was taken back from Henan and included in the experimental province Pingyuan. In November 1953 it was finally reinstated under the Henan administration.

In 1987 a historical relic, made up of a series of clams arranged in dragon patterns, was unearthed. The valuable discovery, which could be dated back to more than 6,400 years ago, had pushed forward the history of Chinese civilization for over 1,400 years, and therefore earned itself an international reputation of "the First Dragon of China". The Chinese Yanhuang Culture Researching Association has accordingly named Puyang "the Hometown of Chinese Dragons”. Abundant heritage along with a long history has endowed Puyang with plenty of tourism resources, which is certainly of great investment value. Chinese scholars therefore regard Puyang as one of the important birthplaces of Chinese civilization.

Tourist sites 
Until the end of 2012, Puyang has 4 national cultural relics protection units: Qicheng Relics, Tangwu Gong Tablet, the former sites of the revolutionary armies which is including Yancunpu revolutionary site and Shanguai former revolutionary base; 25 provincial cultural relics protection units: Xishuiipo Relics, Huiluan Tablet, the memorial site of the revolutionary armies crossing the river, Chengzhuang site, Tieqiu site, Mazhuang site, Xiancheng Relics, Sipai Pavilion (including the nearby folk houses), the tombstone of Wei's family, Puyang Christ church (including the former site of Huamei school), the Martyrs' Cemetery of Weihe county, the former headquarters of PLA, Balimiao Yellow River –controlling memorial (including the iron beast), Nanle Confucius temple, Kuaikui platform site, Cangjie mausoleum site, Danzhu Tomb, zilu Mausoleum, the headquarters site of the field army, the Puzhao Temple, Gaocheng Relics, Xiaqiu site, the anti-Japanese martyrs' shrine in Qingfeng county, the former administration site of Zhinan CPC, Puyang Catholic church. The key cultural relics protection units of city and county level have 201 sites.

The main tourist attractions in the city area are Zhongyuan Green Manor, Qicheng Relics, Pushang Park, Cangjie Tomb, Zhanghui Mausoleum, Emperor Shun's Palace, Huiluan Tablet, Imperial Well, Sipai Pavilion, the four street of Ming & Qing dynasties, the hometown of Emperor Shun, Yancunpu revolutionary site, Shanguai former revolutionary base, the museum of the Liu-Deng Army crossing Yellow River, Puyang Science and Technology Museum etc. In 1994, the line of Confucius traveling around the world 2500 years ago had been approved by China National Tourism Administration and State Administration of Cultural Heritage as the first Chinese tourism special line of cultural relics and historic sites, including Puyang Qicheng Relics, Zilu Tomb, Huiluan Tablet etc. After 1999, Puyang opened up another five special tourism lines. In 2005, puyang one-day red tour, two-day tour had been launched and the PLA sites tour containing Shanguai, Sunkou had been recommended by Henan Tourism Administration as a provincial red tourism line. After 2006, relying on the abundant history and culture resources and its morden city landscape, Puyang developed its tourism deeply and greatly. Till now, Puyang has successfully developed and created a series of tourist brands: the city scenery tour represented by the city squares, gardens and parks, and the water system; the ecological environment tour represented by Zhongyuan Green Manor and Pushang Park; the historical and cultural tour by Qicheng Relics and Cangjie Tomb; the Yellow River scenery tour by Maolou Ecological Tourism Zone; the surname & root seeking tour by Zhanghui Mausoleum and Emperor Shun's Palace; the leisure acrobatics tour by Dongbei village's original acrobatics and modern "Water show" acrobatics; the scientific knowledge tour by Puyang Science and Technology Museum, the efficient agriculture tour by Shijin Park; the classical red tour by Shanguai former revolutionary base and the museum of the Liu-Deng Army crossing the Yellow River; and the modern industry tour by Zhongyuan Oilfield, Zhongyuan Ethylene Plant and Zhongyuan Dahua Group Ltd. etc.

Natural resources 
Puyang is a petrol-chemical city. The major mineral resources include petroleum, natural gas, coal, etc. especially rich reserve of high-quality petroleum and natural gas. As an important national petrol-chemical energy base, large-sized enterprises such as Zhongyuan Oilfield, China Petroleum & Chemical Corporation, Zhongyuan Dahua Group and so on have been established there. The petrol-chemical industry has become the support of Puyang's economy.

References

External links 
Government website of Puyang (in Simplified Chinese)
Puyang, China
Amazing Henan

Cities in Henan
Prefecture-level divisions of Henan